Coat protein may refer to:
 Viral coat protein, a component of the capsid
 Variable surface glycoproteins or procyclins, surface coat proteins of either the bloodstream form or the procyclic form of the parasite Trypanosoma brucei
 COPI, a type of vesicle coat protein that transports proteins from the cis end of the Golgi complex back to the rough endoplasmic reticulum
 COPII, a type of vesicle coat protein that transports proteins from the rough endoplasmic reticulum to the Golgi apparatus